Ayman Al-Hendy, (born January 24, 1964) is a professor and director of translational research from Department of Obstetrics and Gynecology, University of Chicago. His branch of medical/surgical knowledge is obstetrics and gynecology, particularly in the spheres of “gene/stem cell therapy”, “reproductive genetics”, and “stem cell biology”.

Early life and career 

From 2014 to 2018 he served as a professor and Director for Division of Interdisciplinary Translational Research, Department of Obstetrics and Gynecology, Medical College of Georgia, Augusta University (formerly Georgia Regents University), Augusta. Georgia During 2007-2014, he was Scientific Director, Center for Women Health Research, Gynecologist/Obstetrician, professor and Vice Chair, Meharry Medical College, Nashville, Tennessee. Al-Hendy published about 191 original peer-reviewed articles, 24 books/chapters/reviews/case reports, and 239 abstracts presented at scientific conferences.

Al-Hendy’s research has been continuously funded by the National institute of health (NIH, USA) since 2003. He served as chair of the Integrative Clinical Endocrinology and Reproduction (ICER) 2012-2015.

Education background 
He received his M.D from Benha Faculty of Medicine Zagazig University, Benha, Egypt in 1987, and soon after completion of his M.D, he started practicing as an intern at Benha University Hospital Benha, Egypt in 1988. He received his Ph.D. (DNA – laboratory) from Turku University, Finland in 1992; and received postdoctoral research fellow in human genetics from McMaster University, Hamilton, Canada, in 1994

Specialty areas 

Rejuvenation of Premature Ovarian Failure with Stem Cells (ROSE) is Al-Hendy’s ongoing project.

Ayman then corroborated studies to improve the health/medical care of women, and remove health discrepancy. He directed his attention to Uterine Fibroids Treatment and Research Center.

Honors and awards 

 2018 Pfizer‐SRI President’s Presenter’s Award
 2018 Star Award, American Society of Reproductive Medicine (ASRM)
 Best Poster Prize Award, Society of Reproductive Investigations (SRI)
 President Achievement Award–2015
 IRA and ESTER ROSENWAKS New Investigator Award
 Young Investigator Award, San Diego, California 1990

References 

Living people
1964 births
University of Illinois faculty
American obstetricians
Augusta University faculty
People from Benha